The British Supersport Championship, National Superstock 1000 & 600 and the British Motostar Championship are the four main championship series that are run as support races alongside the British Superbike Championship. In 2012 the Motostar category replaced the defunct 125cc category that had been running since the start of the British Superbike Championship in 1988, Motostar was open to both 125 and 250 machines similar to Moto 3 machines.  The Supersport racing started in 1989 and is a class comprising 600cc Motorcycles that are allowed racing modifications and custom tuning.  It wasn't until 2000 that the Superstock 1000 category replaced the defunct 250cc category, with the Superstock 600 championship being the newest addition on the support series in 2008.  In 2010 the Superstock 1000 and Superstock 600 categories also supported the British rounds of the Superbike World Championship and the Moto GP both at Silverstone.

British Supersport Championship

British Supersport Championship is a support series to the British Superbike Championship (BSB). Until 2011 the British Supersport championship ran a single race at every BSB event, since then it has been expanded and now runs two rounds every BSB event. The machines are 600cc production bikes that are allowed a set amount of tuning and aftermarket parts. The BSS championship is seen as a stepping stone for the younger talent to go up to the British Superbike Championship, riders such as: Tom Sykes, Cal Crutchlow and Leon Camier having come through this championship in the past.

Scoring system

Current bike models
 Kawasaki Ninja ZX-6R
 MV Agusta F3 675
 Triumph Daytona 675
 Yamaha YZF-R6

British Supersport champions

British GP2 Cup

The British GP2 Cup, currently known for sponsorship reasons as the Quattro Group British GP2 Cup, is a support series to the British Superbike Championship (BSB).

Founded in 2018, the series races alongside the British Supersport Championship, although the two have separate classifications.

The bikes have prototype chassis like those used in Moto2 and use full-slick tyres (unlike Supersport), but their engines must adhere to Superstock600 regulations, with an output limit of 128 hp.

Mason Law is the reigning champion having claimed the 2020 title racing for Spirit Moto Corsa. The previous two champions Kyle Ryde (2019) and Josh Owens (2018) raced for Team Kovara Projects RS Racing aboard Kalex machinery.

British GP2 Cup winners

National Superstock 1000 Championship

The National Superstock 1000 Championship is a support race for the British Superbike Championship, the superstock 1000 meaning that all the bikes have to be of a stock spec. This means that racing is much cheaper than in other categories as such this category gets many more entrants than any other class on the BSB grid.

National Superstock 1000 champions

National Superstock 600 Championship

The National Superstock 600 Championship is a support race for the British Superbike Championship, the superstock 600 meaning that all the bikes have to be of a pretty stock spec, meaning the bikes that are produced to ride for the public, with a maximum engine size of 600cc.

National Superstock 600 champions

Moto3 Motostar British Championship

The British Motostar Championship was a support race for the British Superbike Championship, this class developed from the defunct 125cc category. At the end of the 2015 season the 125cc class ended and the newer 250cc Moto3 bikes were allowed in this class as a way of a stepping stone to the Moto3 class at world championship level which runs 250cc Moto3 bikes.

125cc Motostar British champions

Moto3 Motostar British champions

Moto3 Standard Motostar British champions

KTM British Junior Cup

The KTM British Junior Cup was a support race for the British Superbike Championship, open to riders 13-18-years old. Every rider lined up on an identical 'Cup' variation of the KTM RC390. The series gave equal opportunity and level playing field for emerging talent across eight events incorporating 20 points-scoring races. Former MCE BSB rider Steve Plater was the Series ambassador.

In 2015 at the Snetterton Circuit, Thomas Strudwick became the youngest ever rider to win a British Championship Race at 13 years, 247 days beating previous record holder Kyle Ryde.

The 2016 KTM British Junior Cup was won by 15 year old Aaron Wright from Northern Ireland. Wright secured the title with 3 races to spare following 11 wins from 15 completed races and a total of 298 points.

KTM British Junior Cup champions

British Junior Supersport Championship

British Junior Supersport champions

See also
Superbike racing
Grand Prix motorcycle racing

References

External links
 BSS Home

Supersport racing
British Superbike Championship Support Series
British Superbike Championship Support Series
Motorcycle racing in the United Kingdom
British Superbike Championship